Heidy Rodríguez (born May 9, 1981 in La Vega), is a Karateka from the Dominican Republic who twice won the golden medal at the Pan American Games. She is 3rd Dan (rank).

She majored in Medicine from Universidad Autónoma de Santo Domingo in 2008.

References

External links
 Fedokarate Bio
 FEDOKARATE

1981 births
Living people
Dominican Republic female karateka
Karateka at the 2007 Pan American Games
Pan American Games gold medalists for the Dominican Republic
Pan American Games medalists in karate
Medalists at the 2007 Pan American Games
20th-century Dominican Republic women
21st-century Dominican Republic women